Catherine Sarah Barnard,  is a British academic, who specialises in European Union, employment, and competition law. She has been Professor of European Union and Employment Law at the University of Cambridge since 2008. She has been a Fellow of Trinity College, Cambridge since 1996, and is the college's Senior Tutor.

Education 
Barnard read law at Fitzwilliam College, Cambridge (MA Cantab), and the European University Institute (LLM). She earned a Doctor of Philosophy (PhD) from the University of Cambridge.

Career 
Barnard was elected a Fellow of Trinity College, Cambridge in 1996. She was appointed Reader in European Union Law in the Faculty of Law, University of Cambridge on 1 October 2004. On 1 October 2008, she was awarded a chair as Professor of European Union and Employment Law.

Selected works

References

Year of birth missing (living people)
Living people
British legal scholars
Women legal scholars
European Union law scholars
Labour law scholars
Scholars of competition law
Fellows of Trinity College, Cambridge
Legal scholars of the University of Cambridge
Alumni of Fitzwilliam College, Cambridge
European University Institute alumni